The cinnamon-rumped trogon (Harpactes orrhophaeus) is a species of bird in the family Trogonidae.

Its natural habitats are subtropical or tropical moist lowland forests and subtropical or tropical moist montane forests.
It is threatened by habitat loss.

Description
The male has a black hood, blue bill, an eyebrow and an eye ring. The upper part is pale brown and the lower part is pink-red. The tail is brown above and it has a white under tail with black borders.
Females have a dark brown head with chestnut around the eye and lores. The lower part is yellowish.

Feeding habits
This bird feeds primarily on insects 2–3 meters above ground.

Habitat
The habitat of this species is humid evergreen forests in Peninsular Thailand and Malaysia. It is restricted to closed canopy lowland forests (up to 180 m).

Reproduction
This species builds its nest in cavity about 1.5 meters above ground and the clutch size is 2 eggs.

Migration
This species is sedentary, it does not migrate.

References

External links
Image at ADW
video of the cinnamon trogon

cinnamon-rumped trogon
Birds of Malaysia
Birds of Malesia
cinnamon-rumped trogon
Taxonomy articles created by Polbot